Leon Everton George Crooks (born 21 November 1985) is an English footballer who is currently a free agent.

Career
Born in Greenwich, London, Leon Crooks joined Wycombe Wanderers in January 2007 from Milton Keynes Dons for a nominal fee. However, he failed to impress manager Paul Lambert, despite fans' spokesman Luke Taylor describing him as a "sensational talent", and in July 2007 he was left out of a pre-season tour to Germany. He requested to be allowed to train with the Dons while he searched for a new contract at the start of the new season but returned to Wycombe after a week having failed to impress new Dons manager Paul Ince. In January 2009 it was announced that Crooks would join Conference National side Ebbsfleet United on month's loan. Crooks made his debut for Ebbsfleet in their 1–0 home league win over Rushden & Diamonds, and the loan was subsequently extended to two, and then three months.

At the end of the 2008–09 season, Wycombe Wanderers released Crooks.

Crooks signed for Ebbsfleet United permanently on 6 August 2009, but was released in the summer of 2010.

References

External links

1985 births
Living people
Footballers from Greenwich
English footballers
Association football defenders
Milton Keynes Dons F.C. players
Wycombe Wanderers F.C. players
Ebbsfleet United F.C. players
English Football League players
National League (English football) players